Fortress chess (also known as Russian Four-Handed chess) is a four-player chess variant played in Russia in the 18th and 19th centuries. The board contains 192 squares including the fortresses at its corners. The fortresses contain 16 squares and various pieces are placed inside.

See also
 Forchess
 Four-player chess

References

External links
 http://www.chessvariants.com/historic.dir/fortress.html
 https://web.archive.org/web/20081013193034/http://www.quadibloc.com/chess/ch0206.htm

Chess variants
Chess in Russia
18th century in chess
Russian inventions